Hyalochna malgassella is a moth in the family Cosmopterigidae. It was described by Viette in 1963. It is found in Madagascar.

References

Natural History Museum Lepidoptera generic names catalog

Scaeosophinae
Moths described in 1963